1993 in professional wrestling describes the year's events in the world of professional wrestling.

List of notable promotions 
These promotions held notable shows in 1993.

Calendar of notable shows

January

February

April

May

June

July

August

September

October

November

December

Accomplishments and tournaments

ECW

WCW

WCW Hall of Fame

WWF

WWF Hall of Fame

Awards and honors

Pro Wrestling Illustrated

Wrestling Observer Newsletter

Notable events
 January 11 - WWF Monday Night Raw premiered on the USA Network, its first episode was from the Manhattan Center in New York City
 February 10 - Bill Watts resigned as Executive Vice President of Wrestling Operations for WCW.
 February 12 – Eric Bischoff becomes Executive Producer of all World Championship Wrestling television and Ole Anderson was announced as new Vice President of Wrestling Operations for WCW.
 February 21 – Ric Flair makes his WCW return and Davey Boy Smith makes his WCW debut at WCW SuperBrawl III in Asheville, North Carolina
 February 22 – Hulk Hogan makes his WWF return live on Monday Night Raw.
 February 25 - Jim Ross resigned from WCW.
 April 4 – Jim Ross makes his WWF TV debut at WrestleMania IX
 April 5 - ECW Hardcore TV debuts on SportsChannel Philadelphia.
 April 13 - WCW makes its New York City debut running an live event at the Paramount Theater in New York, NY headlined with Vader defending the WCW World Heavyweight title vs Sting in the main event drawing 3,000.
 July 7 – WCW Worldwide begins taping at Disney/MGM Studios from Orlando, Florida. This taping schedule ran from July 7–10 taping matches and footage for airing starting the weekend of August 28–29, 1993 which included Ric Flair and Rick Rude wearing the NWA World title, Ricky Steamboat and Lord Steven Regal wearing the WCW TV title and an interview with Paul Roma & Arn Anderson wearing the NWA & WCW world tag team titles and The Nasty Boys managed by Missy Hyatt carrying the NWA World Tag Team titles in the ring.
 September 1 – WCW leaves the National Wrestling Alliance
 September 3 - The NWA Convention was held in Las Vegas, NV, also that same day the  ECW joined the NWA becoming NWA Eastern Championship Wrestling.
 October 6 - Mean Gene Okerlund made his WCW debut at a WCW Saturday Night taping in Atlanta, GA (air date November 5)
 October 27 - Both Sid Vicious and Arn Anderson was both hospitalized following a hotel room brawl which saw both wrestlers stabbing each other with a pair of Scissors after an argument at a hotel bar on WCW's tour of Europe.
 November 24 – For the first time ever a non - WWF title changed hands at a WWF pay-per-view when The Heavenly Bodies defeating SMW Tag Team Champions The Rock 'n' Roll Express in a title match at the Survivor Series in Boston, Massachusetts.
 November 30 - The Boss returns to WCW on a WCW Saturday Night taping in Atlanta, GA.
 December 4 – Bobby Heenan was given an on-air farewell on WWF Monday Night Raw when Gorilla Monsoon picked him up and threw him and his belongings out of the arena and onto the street.

Title changes

ECW

NJPW

FMW

WCW

WWF

Births
 January 7 - Darby Allin 
 February 17 – Magnus, Mexican luchador
 March 4:
James Drake 
Teoman 
 March 5 - Josh Briggs 
 May 7- Will Ospreay
 May 20 – Akam, Canadian wrestler
 May 20 - Vanessa Borne
 June 14 – Esfinge, Mexican luchador
 July 2 - Kamille Brickhouse
 July 28:
Noam Dar, Israeli wrestler
Sammy Guevara 
 August 4 – Henare, New Zealand wrestler
 August 12 – El Soberano, Mexican luchador
 September 9 – Sarah Logan, American female wrestler
 September 24 – Sonya Deville, American female wrestler
 September 30 - Trevor Lee, American wrestler 
 October 10 - Ilja Dragunov 
 November 6 – Bárbaro Cavernario, Mexican luchador
 November 9 - Pete Dunne
 November 11 Will Ospreay 
 December 11 - Sonny Kiss 
 Unknown
Gran Guerrero, Mexican luchador
David Benoit, Canadian-American wrestler and son of Chris Benoit

Debuts
Jeff Bradley
Tom Howard
Nelson Frazier, Jr.
Joey Styles
Doug Basham
Tammy Sytch
Sgt. Craig Pittman

October
Doug Williams
2 - El Zorro
10 - Jeff Hardy
28 - Kamikaze

November
27 - Oziel Toscano

December
8 - Joe Líder
13 – Tsubasa

Retirements
 Al Madril (1970–1993)
 Aníbal (November 1963 – 1993)
 Shirley Crabtree (1952–1993)
 Big John Studd (1972-1993) 
 Bill Watts (1962–1993)
 Bobo Brazil (1951–1993)
 Debbie Malenko (1990-1993) (wrestled matches in 2001 and 2017, returned full time in 2021) 
 Dick Beyer (December 29, 1954 – July 29, 1993)
 Frank Hickey (1935-May 15, 1993) 
 Oliver Humperdink (1965–1993) 
 Omar Atlas (1958–1993)
 Fred Peloquin (1971–1993)

Deaths 
January 27 - André the Giant, French wrestler (b. 1946)
January 31 - Joe McHugh, WWWF announcer (b. 1904) 
February 18 - Kerry Von Erich, American wrestler (b. 1960)
March 10 - Dino Bravo, Canadian wrestler (b. 1948)
March 25 - Wally Karbo, American wrestling promoter (b. 1915)
April 18 - Masahiko Kimura, Japanese wrestler (b. 1917)
April 22 - Chief Big Heart, American wrestler (b. 1927)  
May 25 - D.J. Peterson, American wrestler (b. 1959)
June 7 - Don Kent, American wrestler (b. 1933)
July 19 - Bruno Elrington, British wrestler (b. 1929) 
October 13 - Espectro, Mexican luchador (b. 1934)
October 26 - Oro, Mexican luchador (b. 1971)
 November 1 - Pinkie George (b. 1905)
November 13 - Rufus R. Jones, American wrestler (b. 1933)
December 8 - Frank Hickey, American wrestler (b. 1915) 
December 13 - Larry Cameron, American wrestler (b. 1952)

See also
List of WCW pay-per-view events
List of WWF pay-per-view events
List of ECW supercards and pay-per-view events
List of FMW supercards and pay-per-view events

References

 
professional wrestling